Amin Shojaeian is an Iranian football forward who plays for Fajr Sepasi. He is elder brother of Dariush Shojaeian.

Career
Shojaeian started his career with Fajr Sepasi in 2009.

Club career statistics

References

External links 
Amin Shojaeian at PersianLeague.com

Iranian footballers
Association football forwards
Fajr Sepasi players
1988 births
Living people
People from Shiraz
Sportspeople from Fars province